The 6th Pennsylvania House of Representatives District is in northwestern Pennsylvania and has been represented since 2007 by Bradley T. Roae.

District profile

The 6th Pennsylvania House of Representatives District is located in Crawford County and Erie County and includes the following areas:

Crawford County

Beaver Township
Cochranton
Conneaut Lake
Conneaut Township
Conneautville
East Fairfield Township
East Fallowfield Township
East Mead Township
Fairfield Township
Greenwood Township
Hayfield Township
Linesville
 Meadville
North Shenango Township
Pine Township
Randolph Township
Sadsbury Township
South Shenango Township
Spring Township
Springboro
Summerhill Township
Summit Township
Union Township
Vernon Township
Wayne Township
West Fallowfield Township
West Mead Township
West Shenango Township

Erie County
Albion
Conneaut Township
 Cranesville
 Elk Creek Township
Springfield

Representatives

Recent election results

References

External links
District map from the United States Census Bureau
Pennsylvania House Legislative District Maps from the Pennsylvania Redistricting Commission.  
Population Data for District 6 from the Pennsylvania Redistricting Commission.

Government of Crawford County, Pennsylvania
Government of Erie County, Pennsylvania
6